This is a list of horse breeds usually considered to originate or have developed in Canada and the United States. Some may have complex or obscure histories, so inclusion here does not necessarily imply that a breed is predominantly or exclusively from those countries.

References

Horse